The Women's Overall in the 2021 FIS Alpine Skiing World Cup involved 31 events in 5 disciplines: downhill (DH), Super-G (SG), giant slalom (GS), slalom (SL), and parallel (PAR). The sixth discipline, Alpine combined (AC), had all three of its events in the 2020–21 season cancelled, The tentative women's season schedule included 37 events (plus two team parallels, including one to take place at the season finals), but the final women's schedule cut the number of events to 34 (and only one team parallel) due to the continuing disruption cased by the COVID-19 pandemic. Among the changes were the elimination of the three Alpine combined races (Val d'Isére, St. Anton, Crans Montana) to eliminate the mixing of speed skiers and technical skiers in those events, as well as the elimination of two (St. Moritz, Davos) of the three parallels (and one of the team parallels (Lech/Zürs)) in favor of other races.  Ultimately, only three of the races in this schedule -- one downhill, one Super-G, and one giant slalom -- were canceled during the season, as discussed later. 

In addition to the disruption resulting from the continuing COVID-19 pandemic, the season was interrupted by the 2021 World Ski Championships, which were held from 8–21 February in Cortina d'Ampezzo, Italy.

The last four events of the season were scheduled to take place at the World Cup finals, scheduled for Wednesday, 17 March through Sunday, 21 March in Lenzerheide, Switzerland. Only the top 25 in each specific discipline for the season and the winner of the Junior World Championship are eligible to compete in the finals, with the exception that athletes who have scored at least 500 points in the overall classification are eligible to participate in any discipline, regardless of standing in that discipline for the season. 

The season championship was a battle between the two skiers with the most victories on the season (six): the technical ace Petra Vlhová from Slovakia (four slaloms, two giant slaloms) and the speed ace Lara Gut-Behrami from Switzerland (four Super-Gs, two downhills).  Heading into the finals, Vlhová had a 93-point lead over Gut-Behrami.  Since Gut-Behrami no longer skies in the slalom discipline due to a series of injuries, she needed a strong performance in the two speed races scheduled during the finals, in which she had a predicted advantage over Vlhová, to make up the gap. However, on 17 March, the downhill final (the first event in the finals) had to be cancelled after three days of heavy snowfall. On 18 March, the Super-G final was also cancelled, eliminating both speed finals and providing a distinct edge to a technical skier like Vlhová. And then the bad weather moved out before the slalom finals, and in the that final, Vlhová placed sixth, which gave her 40 points, enough to clinch overall victory before the giant slalom.

Standings

See also
 2021 Alpine Skiing World Cup – Women's summary rankings
 2021 Alpine Skiing World Cup – Women's Downhill
 2021 Alpine Skiing World Cup – Women's Super-G
 2021 Alpine Skiing World Cup – Women's Giant Slalom
 2021 Alpine Skiing World Cup – Women's Slalom
 2021 Alpine Skiing World Cup – Women's Parallel
 2021 Alpine Skiing World Cup – Men's Overall
 World Cup scoring system

References

External links
 Alpine Skiing at FIS website

Women's Overall
FIS Alpine Ski World Cup overall titles